This is a list of episodes for the MBC animated television series Jang Geum's Dream.

Series 1 

The DVD box set contains subtitles in Korean, English, and Japanese, including episode titles.  The Japanese episode titles subtitles differ from NHK's episode titles.  The NHK titles are listed below.  No official English translations are available for the NHK episode titles.

Series 2 

No official English translations are available for season two episode.

Online viewing
Both series are available for time-limited viewing on MBC's website video on demand service.

References 

Jang Geum's Dream